Marco de Rama, O.S.A. (1649–1709) was a Roman Catholic prelate who served as Bishop of Crotone (1690–1709).

Biography
Marco de Rama was born in Alcala de Henares, Spain in 1649 and ordained a priest in the Order of Saint Augustine.
On 13 February 1690, he selected as Bishop of Crotone and confirmed on 22 May 1690 by Pope Alexander VIII.
On 4 June 1690, he was consecrated bishop by Fabrizio Spada, Cardinal-Priest of San Crisogono with Francesco Martelli, Titular Archbishop of Corinthus, and Victor Augustinus Ripa, Bishop of Vercelli, serving as co-consecrators. 
He served as Bishop of Crotone until his death on 4 August 1709.

References

External links and additional sources
 (for Chronology of Bishops) 
 (for Chronology of Bishops) 

17th-century Italian Roman Catholic bishops
18th-century Italian Roman Catholic bishops
Bishops appointed by Pope Alexander VIII
1649 births
1709 deaths
Augustinian bishops